Maryland Airport  is a privately owned, public use airport located four miles (6 km) east of the central business district of Indian Head, in Charles County, Maryland, United States.

Facilities and aircraft 
For the 12-month period ending September 19, 2013, the airport had 17,020 aircraft operations, an average of 47 per day: 88% local general aviation, 6% transient general aviation, 6% military and <1% air taxi.
Phase 3 of the airport's expansion will include extending the runway to 4,300 feet, along with construction of a parallel taxiway, a ramp to accommodate 75 planes, an access road to Bumpy Oak Road, and a new terminal.

See also 
 List of airports in Maryland

References

External links 
Maryland Airport at Maryland Office of Regional Aviation Assistance
 

Airports in Maryland
Transportation buildings and structures in Charles County, Maryland